Sega Bass Fishing, also known as Get Bass, is an arcade fishing video game developed in 1997 by Sega for the Sega Model 3 hardware. The game has since been ported to the Dreamcast, Microsoft Windows, Xbox 360, PlayStation 3 and Wii.

Gameplay
Sega Bass Fishing is an arcade fishing game where players attempt to hook and reel in fish with different lures. It uses a Sega Fishing Controller. Consisting of four stages at different times of the day, the game requires the player to catch a certain weight of fish within a time limit in order to move onto the next stage. The final stage allows only for one fish to be captured, but are among the largest in the game and most difficult to catch. Fish are measured under four weight classes: Small One, Average, Big One, and Huge.

Ports

The game was an early title on the Sega Dreamcast, and was compatible with the Sega Fishing Controller. It sold well and became one of the few Sega All Stars titles.

The Sega Dreamcast port includes a practice mode and a tournament mode, where players can unlock more lures. In addition to the arcade game's four stages, four new stages are also included. Each stage can be played with different fishing conditions, such as the season, weather and time of day. The PC version of the game released in 2001 was based on the Dreamcast version.

An enhanced port of the game was released for the Wii on February 26, 2008. The game utilizes the motion controls of the Wii Remote and optionally the Nunchuck to replicate the Sega Fishing Controller. The game's graphics have been enhanced and it includes the modes, features, stages and unlockables found in the Dreamcast version. The Wii version also introduces seven more stages, bringing the number to fifteen. Arcade mode now consists of courses, with the final course unlocking the original four arcade stages. Nature Trip mode is also introduced, allowing players to practice without the background music playing.

The Sega Dreamcast port of the game was featured in the compilation game Dreamcast Collection released in early 2011 for the Xbox 360 and PC, and as a separate digital download with for Steam in March 2011, the PlayStation Store and Xbox Live Arcade in October 2011.

Reception

In Japan, Game Machine listed Sega Bass Fishing on their February 1, 1998 issue as being the second most-successful dedicated arcade game of the month.

Jeff Lundrigan reviewed the Dreamcast version of the game for Next Generation, rating it four stars out of five, and stated that, "Whether you're a true angler or just looking for a neat party game, buy this (and pick up a fishing controller while you're at it)."

Sega Bass Fishing received mostly positive reviews upon original release. The Xbox 360 and Wii ports received mediocre reviews.

Sequels

A sequel, Sega Bass Fishing 2, developed by WOW Entertainment was released for the Sega Dreamcast in 2001.  The following year, Sega Bass Fishing Duel was released for the PlayStation 2, bringing multiplayer to the series.

In April 2012, an on-rails FPS crossover titled "Sega Bass Fishing of the Dead" was reported to be in production for Nintendo's Wii U and Nintendo 3DS, but the trailer was revealed to be an April Fools' joke by Random Encounters Entertainment.

See also
Sega Marine Fishing

References

External links

1997 video games
Arcade video games
Cavia (company) games
Dreamcast games
Fishing video games
IOS games
PlayStation Network games
Sega arcade games
Sega Games franchises
SIMS Co., Ltd. games
Single-player video games
Video games developed in Japan
Wii games
Windows games
Xbox 360 Live Arcade games